The knockout stage of the 2020 Campeonato Paulista began on 29 July with the quarter-finals and concluded on 8 August 2020 with the final. A total of eight teams competed in the knockout stage.

Round and draw dates
All draws were held at Federação Paulista de Futebol headquarters in São Paulo, Brazil.

Format
The quarter-finals were played over a single match at the stadium of the better-ranked team in the first phase. If no goals were scored during the match, the tie was decided via a penalty shoot-out. The semi-finals were played with the same format as the quarter-finals.
The finals were played over two legs, with the team holding the better record in matches from the previous stages hosting the second leg.

Qualified teams

Bracket

Quarter-finals

Semi-finals

Finals

First leg

Second leg

References

Campeonato Paulista seasons